Religious Experience Reconsidered (2009) is a book by Ann Taves on the study of religious experience. She proposes a new approach, which takes into account the attribution of religious meaning to specific events, using the term "specialness." "The focus of the book is on experiences deemed religious (and, by extension, other things considered special) rather than "religious experience.""

Reception
Kim Knott calls Taves approach an encompassing framework, which can take into account a multitude of things. She doubts, though, if the term "specialness" can replace the term "sacredness."

See also
 Mystical experience

References

Sources

 
 

Cognitive science of religion